Paullus Fabius Persicus (2/1 BCE - some time during the reign of Claudius) was the only son of Paullus Fabius Maximus and Marcia, a maternal cousin of Augustus (daughter of his aunt Atia and L. Marcius Philippus) and great-niece of Julius Caesar. As such, Persicus was a first-cousin-once-removed of Augustus and a great-great-nephew of Julius Caesar.

Birth and name 

Paullus Fabius Persicus is believed to have been born in 2 or 1 BCE. His cognomen - like the praenomen (Paullus) he shared with his father - was given to him to advertise his natural paternal descent from Lucius Aemilius Paullus Macedonicus, who had defeated the last Macedonian monarch, Perseus, in 146 BCE.

Life and career 

The first appearance of Persicus is in June of the year 15, when he was co-opted into the Arval Brethren aged c. 15 to replace his then recently deceased father. Around the same time, he was also made a member of the College of Pontiffs and of the Sodales Augustales. He subsequently held the posts of quaestor under Tiberius and praetor, though the details of these posts are unknown. His next dated post is in 34, when he became ordinary consul with Lucius Vitellius, the father of the later Roman Emperor Vitellius, as his colleague.

After his consulship, his next post was proconsul of Asia in the reign of Claudius (c. 44). An edict written by Persicus from his time as proconsul of Asia survives, addressed to the Ephesians concerning issues in the worship of the Goddess Artemis.

He seems to have died sometime in the reign of Claudius.

Character 

According to Seneca the Younger, Persicus was a particularly vile person, who owed his career more to his ancestry than to his own merit. Ronald Syme adds, "He was also shunned by the virtuous and exemplary Julus Graecinus, the parent of Julius Agricola, unresponsive to the Narbonensian clientela of the Fabii."

Footnotes

References 
 Braund, D.; Augustus to Nero: A Source Book on Roman History 31 BC-AD 68 (Taylor & Francis, 1985) , 
 L'Année Epigraphique (AE)
 Stevenson, G., Power and Place: Temple and Identity in the Book of Revelation (Walter de Gruyter, 2001)
 Syme, Ronald; Augustan Aristocracy (Oxford University Press, 1989). , 
 Seneca the Younger, De Beneficiis (On Benefits)

Julio-Claudian dynasty
Persicus, Paullus
0s BC births
1st-century deaths
1st-century BC Romans
1st-century Romans
1st-century clergy
Imperial Roman consuls
Roman governors of Asia
Year of birth uncertain
Year of death unknown